Regina Elaine Belle (born July 17, 1963) is an American singer-songwriter who started her career in the mid-1980s. Known for her singles "Baby Come to Me" (1989) and "Make It Like It Was" (1990), Belle's most notable for two hit duets, both with Peabo Bryson: "Without You", the love theme from the comedy film Leonard Part 6, recorded in 1987 and "A Whole New World", the main theme of the Disney's animated feature film Aladdin, recorded in 1992, with which Belle and Bryson won the Grammy award.
The theme song "Far Longer than Forever" from the animated movie The Swan Princess, performed with Jeffrey Osborne, was nominated for a Golden Globe in 1995 for Best Original Song.

Biography

Early life and education
Belle was born in Englewood, New Jersey. It was at Englewood's Mount Calvary Baptist Church, and then Paterson's Friendship Baptist Church (presided over by Belle's uncle, the Reverend Fred Belle), that Belle began attracting attention with her vocal abilities. She sang her first solo in church at the age of eight. She attended Dwight Morrow High School, where she studied trombone, tuba and steel drums. After graduation, Belle studied opera at the Manhattan School of Music. She attended Rutgers University and became the first female vocalist with the school's jazz ensemble. 
Belle's musical influences include Phyllis Hyman, Billie Holiday, Shirley Caesar, Patti LaBelle, and Nancy Wilson. She was introduced to the Manhattans by New York radio DJ Vaughn Harper and began working as their opening act. She recorded the duet "Where Did We Go Wrong" with the group on their Back to Basics album, which helped to attract the attention of Columbia Records. She recorded a second duet, "Maybe Tomorrow", which appeared on the B-side of "Where Did We Go Wrong". They eventually signed her to a record deal.

Career

In 1987, she released her debut album All by Myself. It includes her first hits "So Many Tears" and "Show Me the Way". In the same year, Belle recorded her first successful duet with Peabo Bryson: the song "Without You", the love theme from the comedy film Leonard Part 6, also released in 1987. The song was her first single to appear on the Adult Contemporary (chart), peaking at #8 and was also her first single to appear in four charts, including the UK Singles, peaking at #85, her best position in this chart until 1989. Her follow-up album, Stay with Me, released in 1989. Belle recorded a duet in 1991 with Johnny Mathis, "Better Together" which appeared on his album Better Together: The Duet Album. Continuing her tradition of duets, Belle teamed up with Peabo Bryson for four songs: "Without You" (in 1987), "I Can't Imagine" (in 1991), "A Whole New World" (in 1992) and "Total Praise" (in 2009).

Later in 1993, she released her Platinum selling third album, Passion. The album featured the Disney hit, "A Whole New World". The theme song "Far Longer than Forever" from the animated movie The Swan Princess, performed with Jeffrey Osborne was nominated for a Golden Globe in 1995 for Best Original Song. She released Reachin' Back in 1995 followed by Believe in Me in 1998.

In 2001, her cover of "Just the Two of Us" from the tribute album To Grover, With Love made a surprising return to the Billboard charts. Within months Belle would sign with the jazz-oriented independent label Peak-Concord Jazz. She released the album This Is Regina!, which featured the R&B hit single "Ooh Boy", and also released were, "Don't Wanna Go Home" and "From Now On" with Glenn Jones. In 2004, she released a jazz standard album, Lazy Afternoon, produced by George Duke. The album included covers of the Isley Brothers' "For the Love of You" and Tony Bennett's "If I Ruled the World". In 2007, she collaborated with smooth jazz saxophonist Paul Taylor, co-writing and singing on his album "Ladies Choice". Belle released her debut gospel album Love Forever Shines on May 13, 2008, via Pendulum Records. The 14-track collection features guests Melvin Williams (of the Williams Brothers) and Shirley Murdock. On June 5, 2012, Belle released on Pendulum her second gospel album, called Higher, on which she stated: "I think that, with the second CD [Higher] I had a better understanding of where I wanted to go [compared to Love Forever Shines]". Belle has appeared in concert with many other performers, including Ray Charles, Boney James, Paul Taylor, The Rippingtons, Gerald Albright, Will Downing, Maze, Frankie Beverly, Phil Perry, Al Jarreau, and Stephanie Mills.

Personal life
Belle has been married twice. Her first marriage was to saxophonist and flute player Horace Alexander Young from 1985 until 1990, and together they adopted daughter named Tiy (born 1989). Belle married former NBA basketball player John Battle on June 25, 1991. The couple has four children together, two of whom are adopted: daughter Winter, and son Jayln. After suffering miscarriages of two sets of twin boys, the couple had daughter Sydni (born 1994) and Nyla (born November 10, 1995). Belle has two grandchildren from Winter, Thea and Joshua. Belle successfully battled a brain tumor in 2009. However, she is now deaf in her left ear. Belle and her husband reside in Atlanta, Georgia. John is a pastor of a church in Atlanta.

Discography

Studio albums

Compilations
 1997: Baby Come to Me: The Best of Regina Belle
 2001: Super Hits
 2006: Love Songs

Singles

Awards and nominations
American Music Award
1991, Favorite Soul/R&B Female Artist (Nominated)
Grammy Award

|-
| 1991
| "Make It Like It Was"
| Best Female R&B Vocal Performance
| 
|-
| rowspan="2" | 1994
| rowspan="2" | "A Whole New World" (with Peabo Bryson)
| Record of the Year
| 
|-
| Best Pop Performance by a Duo or Group with Vocals
| 
|-
| 1999
| Believe in Me
| Best Traditional R&B Vocal Album
| 
|-
| 2002
| This is Regina
| Best Traditional R&B Vocal Album
| 
|}

MTV Movie Awards
1993, Best Song From a Movie: "A Whole New World" (with Peabo Bryson) (Nominated)

See also 
List of number-one hits (United States)
List of artists who reached number one on the Hot 100

References

External links 
Regina Belle official website

Regina Belle 2016 Audio Interview at Soulinterviews.com

1963 births
Living people
20th-century American singers
20th-century American women singers
21st-century American women singers
20th-century African-American women singers
American contemporary R&B singers
American women pop singers
American soul singers
People from Englewood, New Jersey
Singers from New Jersey
Ballad musicians
Concord Records artists
Grammy Award winners
Dwight Morrow High School alumni
21st-century African-American women singers